This list of general awards in the humanities is an index to articles about notable awards for general contributions to the humanities, a collection of academic disciplines that study aspects of human society and culture. These awards typically have broad scope, and may apply to many or all areas within the humanities. The list is organized by region and country of the sponsoring organization, but awards are not necessarily limited to people from that country.

Americas

Asia

Europe

See also

 Lists of awards
 Lists of humanities awards

References

 
Humanities